The 2018 season was the 11th season for the Indian Premier League franchise Mumbai Indians.

Offseason

Support staff changes
 In December 2017, Jonty Rhodes stepped down as the fielding coach in order to focus on personal business.
 In December 2017, James Pamment was appointed fielding coach.
 In February 2018, Lasith Malinga was named as the bowling mentor of the team.

Others
In March 2018, the franchise signed up Goibibo as the principal sponsor of the team for the season. As part of the deal, Goibibo was sported on the back of the team jersey. Later that month, the franchise onboarded Samsung as the lead sponsor of the team, replacing Videocon. The three-year contract with Samsung was worth approximately 25 crore per year, according to a report in the Economic Times.

Squad 
 Players with international caps are listed in bold.

Season

League table

Results

League matches

References

External links
Official Website

Mumbai Indians seasons